The Fearless Hyena is a 1979 Hong Kong action comedy kung fu film written, directed by and starring Jackie Chan. It was Chan's directorial debut. The film was a box office success.

The film has been released under several alternative titles internationally, including:

 Revenge of the Dragon (USA video title)
 Superfighter 3 (West Germany video title)
 The Shadowman (West Germany video title)

The film had a sequel, Fearless Hyena Part II, released in 1983.

Plot
Ching Hing-lung (Jackie Chan) is a youngster, living in a remote village with his grandfather, kung fu master Ching Pang-fei (James Tien). Lung does not take his training seriously enough, he gambles, and he gets into fights which lead him to display the skills his grandfather has told him he must keep secret.

Lung briefly finds employment selling coffins, working for an unscrupulous proprietor (Dean Shek), who even stoops to selling second-hand coffins. Lung is fired when he accidentally traps his boss in one of the coffins. After making his escape, he runs into three thugs he had beaten up earlier, who ask him to teach them kung fu. Lung meets their sifu, Tee Cha (Lee Kwan), the unskilled leader of the Everything Clan. Master Tee offers Lung a lucrative job training his students and fighting against the top fighters from rival schools. This boosts the reputation of the school and of the scheming Master Tee. However, Lung makes the mistake of naming the school under the Ying Yee clan name. This comes to the attention of evil kung fu master Yam Tin-fa (Yam Sai-kwoon), who finds and kills Lung's grandfather. But, Lung eventually takes revenge for his grandfather's murder after undergoing rigorous training from The Unicorn (Chan Wai-lau).

Cast
Jackie Chan as Shing Lung 
James Tien as Ching Pang-pei, Lung's grandfather
Dean Shek as The Coffin Seller
Chan Wai-lau as Unicorn 
Yam Sai-koon as Yam Tin-fa
Lee Kwan as Tee Cha
Rocky Cheng as "The Willow Sword" Bar Tar
Chiang Chih-ping
Chu Siu-wa
Eagle Han-ying as Chin Wa-li
Hp Hing-nam
Chui Yuen
Wong Ken-mei
Kim Sae-ok
Kuo Nai-hua
Alan Chui Chung-San
Chang Ma
Peng Kong
Wong Yiu as Stony Egg
Man Lee-pang
Wong Chi-sang as One of Yam's men
Wang Jia-en

Fight scenes

Fearless Hyena features several unusual slapstick fight scenes, including a chopsticks duel (homage later paid in the cartoon film, Kung Fu Panda), Hing-lung fighting disguised as a cross-eyed mentally retarded man, disguised as a woman, and using "Emotional Kung-Fu", a style that involves vividly displaying the emotions of anger, sorrow, joy and happiness to find the opponent's weakness thus fighting whilst crying or laughing.

Box office

In South Korea, where it released in 1980, the film sold 436,545 tickets in Seoul City, equivalent to an estimated .

In France, it sold 187,706 tickets in 1984, equivalent to an estimated .

Combined, the film grossed an estimated  in Asia and Europe.

See also

 Jackie Chan filmography
 List of martial arts films
 List of films in the public domain in the United States

References

External links
 Fearless Hyena at Hong Kong Cinemagic
 
 

1979 films
1979 comedy films
1979 directorial debut films
1979 martial arts films
1970s action comedy films
Films directed by Jackie Chan
Hong Kong action comedy films
Hong Kong martial arts comedy films
Kung fu films
Wushu films
1970s Hong Kong films